Shayna Small is an American actor, musician, and audiobook narrator.

Personal life 
Small attended the Baltimore School for the Arts and received a Bachelor of Fine Arts in Drama from the Juilliard School.

Career 
Since graduating from the Juilliard School, she has taught and mentored  at the ASTEP, Baltimore School for the Arts, CenterStage, Helen Hayes Foundation, Showdown Theatre Snow College, and Stella Adler Conservatory. She has also served as an Arts Ambassador for the Boys and Girls Club of Greater Washington, as well as an acting coach for operetta Qadar under the artistic direction of Denyce Graves. 

Beyond her career as an actress and audiobook narrator, Small has sung at The Apollo, DC Jazz Fest, Joe's Pub, The Kennedy Center, Lincoln Center,  Les Poisson Rouge, and Saturday Night Live.

Awards and honors

Awards

Best of lists

Narrations

Stage performances

Off-Broadway 

 Parable of the Sower (The Public Theater)
 Rags Parkland Sings Songs of the Future (Ars Nova workshop)

Regional 

 Buddy: The Buddy Holly Story (Cincinnati Playhouse)
 The Colored Museum (Huntington Theatre Company)
 The Glorious World of Crowns, Kinks, and Curls (Baltimore Center Stage)
 How to Catch Creation (Baltimore Center Stage & Philadelphia Theatre Company)
 Intimate Apparel (Bay Street Theatre)
 Just Right Just Now (Theater for the New City) 
 Closer (Load of Fun Theatre)
 The Oregon Trail (Eugene O’Neill Theater Center)

The Juilliard School 

 Assassins
 Henry IV (Part I)
 The House of Bernarda Alba
 Toya in Hurt Village
 Romeo and Juliet
 The Threepenny Opera

References

External links 

 Official website

21st-century women
21st-century American actors